Kotananduru Mandal is one of the 21 mandals in Kakinada District of Andhra Pradesh. As per census 2011, there are 14 villages.

Demographics 
Kotananduru Mandal total population of 48,512 as per the Census 2011 out of which 24,096 are males while 24,416 are females and the Average Sex Ratio of Kotananduru Mandal is 1,013. The total literacy rate of Kotananduru Mandal is 54.43%. The male literacy rate is 55.32% and the female literacy rate is 42.17%.

Towns & Villages

Villages 

 Allipudi
 Bhimavarapukota
 Billananduru
 Boddavaram
 Indugapalle
 K. E. Chinnayyapalem
 Kakarapalle
 Kamatam Mallavaram
 Koppaka Agraharam
Kotananduru
 Kottam
 Lakshmidevipeta
 Surapurajupeta
 Thatipaka Jagan Nadha Nagaram

See also 

 jagannadhapuram

List of mandals in Andhra Pradesh

References 

Mandals in Kakinada district
Mandals in Andhra Pradesh